Paraplatyptilia vacillans is a moth of the family Pterophoridae that is found in Russia (Amur region).

References

Moths described in 1884
vacillans
Endemic fauna of Russia